Meiji Hashimoto (橋本明治, Hashimoto Meiji) (1904-1991) was a Japanese Nihonga painter and designer.

He received a commission to paint a piece for the new Tokyo Imperial Palace. The piece titled “Sakura (cherry)” is a large painting measuring 2.74x2.5 metres. 
It is located on the cedar door of the east corridor of the Seiden hall. Opposite of it on the other side is “Kaede (maples)” by Hōshun Yamaguchi.

See also 
 Seison Maeda (1885–1977), one of the leading Nihonga painters
 List of Nihonga painters

References 

1904 births
1991 deaths
Japanese painters
Buddhist artists
Recipients of the Order of Culture
People from Shimane Prefecture
Artists from Shimane Prefecture